Fustius papei is a moth of the family Erebidae first described by Michael Fibiger in 2010. It is known from Thailand.

The wingspan is about 10 mm. The head, patagia, anterior part of the tegulae, prothorax, basal part of the costa, triangular patch of the medial area, outer part of the subterminal area and the terminal area, including the outer half of the fringes are black. The forewing is long and narrow, with a pointed apex. It has a white ground colour. The crosslines are untraceable, except the terminal line which is marked by black interneural dots. The hindwing is grey, with a narrow brown terminal line and an indistinct discal spot. The fringes are basally beige and outwards grey. The underside of the forewing is brown, while the underside of the hindwing is light grey, with a discal spot.

References

Micronoctuini
Taxa named by Michael Fibiger
Moths described in 2010